Velayudhan Chempakaraman Thampi of Thalakulam (1765–1809) was the Dalawa or Prime Minister of the Indian kingdom of Travancore between 1802 and 1809 during the reign of Bala Rama Varma Kulasekhara Perumal. He is best known for being one of the earliest individuals to rebel against the British East India Company's authority in India.

Early life
Velayudhan Thampi was born in a Nair family to Manakkara Kunju Mayatti Pillai and his wife Valliyamma Pillai Thankachi of Thalakkulam. He was born on 6 May 1765 in the village of Thalakkulam in Travancore which is in the present day district of Kanyakumari in Tamilnadu then a southern district of Travancore State. His full title was "Idaprabu Kulottunga Kathirkulathu Mulappada Arasarana Irayanda Thalakulathu Valiya Veettil Thampi Chempakaraman Velayudhan" being from the family that held the ownership of the province and the high title of Chempakaraman for their services to the modern state created by Maharajah Marthanda Varma. 
Velu Thampi, was appointed a Kariakkar or Tahsildar at Mavelikkara during the initial years of the reign of Maharajah Dharmaraja Ramavarma.

Rise to Dalawaship
Bala Rama Varma was one of Travancore's least popular sovereigns whose reign was marked by unrest and various internal and external political problems. He became rajah at the age of sixteen and fell under the influence of the corrupt nobleman Jayanthan Sankaran Nampoothiri from the Zamorin of Calicut's kingdom. One of the first atrocities of his reign was the murder of Raja Kesavadas, the then Dewan of Travancore. Sankaran Nampoothiri was subsequently appointed Dewan or Prime Minister assisted by two other ministers. The state treasury was soon empty due to corruption so it was decided to collect money by ordering the tahsildars (district officers) to pay large amounts of money which were determined without any reference to the revenue of the districts. Velu Thampi, the Tahasildar(Karyakar) of a southern district, was ordered to pay Rs. 3000 to which he responded that he needed three days to pay. Velu Thampi returned to his district, gathered the people and an uprising ensued. People from all parts of Travancore united to surround the palace and demand the immediate dismissal and banishment of Jayanthan Sankaran Nampoothiri. They also demanded that his two ministers (Matthoo Tharakan, Sankaranarayanan Chetty) be brought to a public place then undergo flogging and have their ears cut off. The punishments were duly carried out and the two ministers were put in jail at Trivandrum. Velu Thampi was later appointed the Dalawa of Travancore.

Career as Dalawa

After Velu Thampi became Dalawa of Travancore he faced serious opposition from two relatives of the late Raja Kesavadas who sought assistance to get rid of him from their associates in Bombay. These letters were intercepted and presented to the Maharajah in a negative light and he ordered the immediate execution of the two men, Chempakaraman Kumaran Pillai and Erayiman Pillai. Having cleared the way, Velu Thampi became Dalawa with no opposition. The Madras Government sanctioned his appointment within a few months.

Even though Velu Thampi tried to enforce justice, he was not an able statesman like Ramayyan Dalawa or Raja Kesavadas, his immediate two predecessors. He was of rebellious nature. Within three years of the death of Raja Kesavadas the country was plagued with corruption and various problems caused by the banished Namboodiri Dalawa. Velu Thampi resorted to harsh punishments with a view to improve the situation. Flogging, cutting off of ears and noses as well as nailing people to trees were some of the punishments adopted during his term as Dalawa. He was also very strict in punishing wrong doers. Nevertheless, his harsh measures produced results and peace and order were restored within a year of Velu Thampi's accession to the Dalawaship.

Intrigues
The Dalawa's undue severity and overbearing conduct resulted in resentment amongst his colleagues, the very same people who had assisted his rise to power. A conspiracy was formed against him under the influence of Kunjunilam Pillai, a powerful Travancore cabinet official who succeeded in getting the Maharajah to sign a royal warrant to arrest and immediately execute Velu Thampi Dalawa. The Dalawa was at Allepey when he received news of the conspiracy and immediately hurried to Cochin to meet the British Resident, Major Colin Macaulay, who had become a good friend. Macaulay had already received evidence that Kunjunilam Pillai had a major hand in the murder of Raja Kesavadas and hence he armed Velu Thampi with a small force of British soldiers and sent him to Trivandrum to investigate Kunjunilam Pillai's conspiracy. Pillai was found guilty of murder and conspiracy and punished accordingly. With this obstacle removed, Velu Thampi regained his former influence.

Mutiny of the Nair troops
The armies of Travancore consisted mainly of members of the Nair group of castes. Velu Thampi's 1804 proposal to reduce their allowances was met with immediate discontent. The troops believed that the idea had come from the British and immediately resolved to assassinate both Col. Macaulay and Velu Thampi. Velu Thampi fled once more to Cochin to seek refuge with Col. Macaulay. The Nairs marched to Trivandrum with a ten thousand strong army of sepoys and demanded that the Maharajah immediately dismiss the Dalawa and end any alliance with the British. Meanwhile, the Resident and the Dalawa collected forces at Cochin and, assisted by the Carnatic Brigade, marched to Trivandrum and put an end to the mutiny. Several of its leaders were executed in the most gruesome manner. One Krishna Pillai, a commander of a regiment, had his legs tied to two elephants which were driven in opposite directions, tearing him into two.

Alliance with the British
The Treaty signed with the British East India Company by the popular Maharajah Dharma Raja Rama Varma in 1795 was revised in what is known as the Treaty of 1805 (according to the English East India Company's policy of "Subordinate Isolation") after the insurrection of the Nair troops in Travancore. It increased the British Indian force stationed in Travancore and the amount of money to be paid as tribute to the British, though the expenditure of the State in maintaining its own standing army was drastically cut. This was the main change brought about in the Treaty of 1805.

Position
Travancore was at that time, owing to all its internal problems, facing a heavy financial crisis and the ratification of the Treaty by Velu Thampi created serious discontent as it increased the dependence of Travancore on the British and also made it indebted to the English Company. In spite of being fully aware of the financial crisis in Travancore, the Resident Col. Macaulay pressed Velu Thampi for immediate payment of the large amount of tribute and the expenses of putting down the mutiny of the Nair troops. The Maharajah meanwhile wrote to the Madras government for the recall of the Resident and appointment of a new Resident which was denied. But this news made the Resident more obstinate against Travancore and he pressurised the Dalawa for payments immediately.

The Dalawa was now disillusioned with the British whom he had considered a friend and who considered any "aggression on Travancore as an aggression on themselves" as per the previous treaties. His discontent was first given vent to by the assassination of the ambassador of the Resident in the court. The Maharajah had communicated his discontent with the Dalawa to this ambassador, Sthanapathy Subba Iyer, and this information was known to the Maharajahs wife, Arumana Amma, a noblewomen of the Arumana Ammaveedu family. She was a lady of influence, who apparently communicated Royal secrets to the Dalawa, and she informed the Dalawa of the Maharajah's intention to dismiss him, with support from the Resident. This increased the anger of the Dalawa against the British who felt that the Resident, in addition to demanding impossible amounts of money and had now started interfering with the internal affairs of the state.. Following this, Subba Iyer, the envoy of the Resident, who had met up with the Dalawa for discussions, was found dead, ostensibly due to a snake bite.

At the same time, in the neighbouring Kingdom of Cochin, Paliyath Govindan Achan, the powerful Dalawa of Cochin, was involved in feuds with some of the other ministers. He had the commander-in-chief and a previous minister seized and drowned in the river at Chanamangalom and attempted to kidnap his rival and sworn enemy, the finance minister Nadavarampathu Kunju Krishna Menon. The Maharajah of Cochin was forced to give Nadavarampathu Kunju Krishna Menon refuge in his own palace at Vellarapilli and then sent for Col. Macaulay and requested him to protect Kunju Krishna Menon. Col. Macaulay took Kunju Krishna Menon to Cochin under his protection. The Paliyath Achan then decided to kill both Kunju Krishna Menon and as well his protector Col. Macaulay.

Insurrection

Velu Thampi Dalawa and the Paliath Achan, Govindan Menon, met and decided on the extirpation of the British Resident and end of British supremacy in their respective states. Dalawa Velu Thampi organised recruits, strengthened forts and stored up ammunition while similar preparations was made by the Paliath Achan in Cochin. Velu Thampi appealed to the Zamorin of Calicut and to the French for assistance, but both did not acknowledge the request. The plan of the Paliath Achan and Velu Thampi was to unitedly attack the Fort of Cochin and murder the British Resident Col. Macaulay and Kunju Krishna Menon. Under the leadership of Vaikom Padmanabha Pillai, troops from the garrisons at Alleppey, Alangad and Paravoor were transferred stealthily through the backwaters in covered boats to Kalvathy where they met up with four thousand of Paliyath Achan's followers.

On the night of 28 December 1808, the force attacked the palace, overwhelmed the Indian guards and domestics, but due to the warning of a native domestic, the resident and Kunju Krishna Menon managed to flee to a frigate, HMS Piedmontese, which was anchored in Cochin harbour. Simultaneously, the rebels attacked the British garrison at Quilon on 30 December 1808 but were repulsed. Unhappy with the failure to capture or kill the Resident as well as the failure in Quilon, Velu Thampi moved south from Cochin and on 11 January 1809 (1st Makaram 984 M.E.), Velu Thampi issued his famous Kundara Proclamation in which he exhorted the nation to throw out the British. He organised another force to attack the British garrison at Quilon and the Battle of Quilon took place on 15 January 1809 in which Velu Thampi's force lost 15 guns and suffered casualties.

Velu Thampi sent a part of his force to launch an amphibious attack on the British garrison at Cochin which was defended by Major Hewitt. On 18 January 1809, the rebel forces at Quilon were totally defeated when they attempted to capture the garrison. On 19 January 1809, the British army, supported by HMS Piedmontese together with boats owned by Paliyath Achan's many rivals and enemies amongst the Cochin nobility, successfully repelled an attack on the Cochin garrison. On 30 January 1809, a small force of 3 military officers and 30 European soldiers were captured and executed on the Dalawa's orders at Purakkad, even though one of the officers, Surgeon Hume, had treated Velu Thampi in the past. A sick lady who was a member of this party was permitted to travel unharmed to Cochin, since it was contrary to the laws of Travancore to kill women.

In the aftermath of the battle at Quilon, Velu Thampi moved to the southern border of Travancore to bolster the defence at Aramboly pass located at Aralvaimozhi. The two mile long fortifications there were guarded by masonry walls and had around 50 artillery pieces covering the road from Palayamkottai. On 6 February 1809, a force under Hon. Col. St. Leger marched from Tiruchirappalli and reached the fortified lines at Aramboly. On the morning of 10 February 1809, the British attacked the flanks of the line from the southern mountain and Velu Thampi fled from Aramboly. The British forces moved into the interior of Travancore on 17 February, meeting up with the rebels who were entrenched in a fortified dugout in Kottar. The rebels were routed by Col. McLeod and within a few days, the strategic forts of Udayagiri and Padmanabhapuram fell to the British without a fight. On hearing the news, the rebels at Quilon dispersed and Col. Chalmers approached Trivandrum from the North and Hon. Col. St. Leger approached from the south in a pincer movement.

Velu Thampi fled from Trivandrum to Kilimanoor and the Maharajah turned against him and denounced him. On 24 February 1809, the Hon. Col. St. Leger had a letter delivered to the Maharajah demanding the surrender of Thambi. The Maharajah appointed one of his nobility, Marthandam Eravi Ummini Thampi, a sworn enemy of Velu Thampi, as a mediator between Travancore and the British. Ummini Thampi reached the British forces who were camped at Pappenamcode and conveyed the Maharajah's terms to them. A reward of Rs. 50,000, a princely sum in those days, was offered for Velu Thampi's capture and both Travancore and British officers were deployed to find him. On 18 March 1809, the Maharajah appointed Ummuni Thampi as Dalawa with the blessings of the British. His officials tracked the former Dalawa Velu Thampi to the forests of Kunnathoor. Velu fled from there and took refuge with a priest at Mannadi. Velu Thampi's servant who had some gold utensils on his person, was noticed by a shopkeeper who informed Dalawa Ummini Thampi's men. The servant was arrested by the new Dalawa's officials who elicited the information from him regarding Velu Thampi. Velu Thampi fled to the Bhagavathy temple at Mannadi where, when surrounded by the would-be captors, he committed suicide . Velu Thampi's brother Padmanabhan Thampi was caught at the scene. The body of Velu Thampi was exposed in the gibbet at Kannammoola. Lord Minto, the then Governor General, strongly condemned this act, describing the act as "repugnant to the feelings of common humanity and the principles of a civilised government".

Aftermath

During the trial for the murder of prisoners on 30 January 1809 at Purrakad beach, Padmanabhan Thampi was found guilty of complicity in the act and was hanged in Trivandrum on 10 April. Dalawa Ummuni Thampi took revenge on the family of Dalawa Velu Thampi by levelling their ancestral house to the ground and had most of Velu Thampi's family banished to the Maldives. Other leaders such as Vaikom Padmanabha Pillai were hanged at Quilon, Purakkad and Palthuruthee. The Paliyath Achan surrendered to the British and was exiled first to Madras and then to Benares where he died in 1835. His nemesis, Kunju Krishna Menon later became the Dalawa of Cochin; one of his daughters later married a Maharajah of Travancore. Maharajah Balarama Varma died in 1810 and Maharani Gowri Lakshmi Bayi took charge of the Kingdom first as Maharani and then as Queen Regent. Col. Macaulay retired in 1810. Ummini Thampi Dalawa retired in 1811 and the then resident, Col. John Munro, 9th of Teaninich was appointed as Dalawa.

The Government of Kerala instituted a memorial to Dalawa Velu Thampi, a research centre, a museum, a park and a statue at Mannadi near Adoor. Another statue of Velu Thampi Dalawa can be found in front of the Secretariat of Kerala in Trivandrum.

In popular culture 
Veluthampi Dalawa is a 1962 Indian Malayalam-language film based on the life of the Dewan. Directed by G. Viswanath, it stars Kottarakkara Sreedharan Nair in the titular role.

Honours

The sword that was used by Velu Thampi Dalawa in his fight against the British, was kept with the Kilimanoor royal family, for about 150 years. It was presented in 1957, to India's then president Rajendra Prasad by a member of the royal family. On 20 June 2010 it was brought back to Kerala and was placed in the Napier Museum (Art Museum)Thiruvananthapuram, Kerala.

A commemorative postage stamp on him was issued on 6 May 2010.

Notes

External links

 Nangol Houses of Travancore

Diwans of Travancore
History of Kollam
Malayali people
People from Kanyakumari district
1809 deaths
1765 births
18th-century Indian people
18th-century Indian politicians
19th-century Indian people
19th-century Indian politicians